Ferrari has made three models named GTO: 
 1962-64 Ferrari 250 GTO GT racing car
 1984-87 Ferrari 288 GTO Group B racing car
 2011 Ferrari 599 GTO